The Morning (original title Jutro) is a 1967 Yugoslav film directed by Mladomir Puriša Đorđević. It is the third part of a wartime tetralogy by Đorđević. The film entered in competition at the 28th Venice International Film Festival and Ljubiša Samardžić won the Volpi Cup for Best Actor for his role.

Cast
 Ljubiša Samardžić as Mali
 Neda Arnerić as Devojka
 Milena Dravić as Aleksandra
 Mija Aleksić as Kapetan Straja 
 Ljuba Tadić as General Milan Prekic
 Neda Spasojević as Marklena

References

External links
 

1967 films
Yugoslav war drama films
Films set in Serbia
Films set in Yugoslavia
Serbian-language films